The Worst Jobs in History is a British television series hosted by Tony Robinson on Channel 4. The second series was shown in March 2006 on History Television in Canada, then in April 2006 on Channel 4 in the UK. The first season is also shown with some regularity on History International.  Tony Robinson tries his hand at each of the jobs, ultimately nominating which one he thought was the worst in each program.

First series
This was broadcast in 2004 and concentrated on a different historical period per program: Roman, Anglo-Saxon, Medieval, Tudor, Stuarts, Georgian, and Victorian.

Some of the more repulsive or dangerous jobs included fuller, executioner, leech collector, plague burier, rat-catcher, leather tanner, gong farmer, and sin-eater.

There was a one-off special called The Worst Christmas Jobs in History in December 2005.

Second series
Broadcast first in March 2006 on The History Channel in Canada, then in April 2006 on Channel 4 in the UK. This series concentrated on particular job settings: urban, royal, industrial, maritime and rural.

International broadcasters
Australia – The ABC screens this program on Sunday nights. It generally rates very well, often with 1 million viewers
Finland – The Yle screens the program on Yle Teema.

Books

See also
Dirty Jobs – US television series about disagreeable jobs
Dirty, Dangerous and Demeaning – concept of a certain form of work

References

External links

2006 British television series debuts
2006 British television series endings
Channel 4 original programming
Historical television series